Giovanna Burlando (born 20 November 1969) is an Italian former synchronized swimmer who competed in the 1992, 1996 and 2000 Summer Olympics.

References

1969 births
Living people
Italian synchronized swimmers
Olympic synchronized swimmers of Italy
Synchronized swimmers at the 1992 Summer Olympics
Synchronized swimmers at the 1996 Summer Olympics
Synchronized swimmers at the 2000 Summer Olympics
Synchronized swimmers at the 1991 World Aquatics Championships